V20 or V-20 may refer to:
V20 engine, an engine with twenty cylinders
NEC V20, a microprocessor
ATC code V20 Surgical dressings, a subgroup of the Anatomical Therapeutic Chemical Classification System
UV-20 Chiricahua, a variant of the Pilatus PC-6 used by the U.S. Military
Canon V-20, an MSX home computer
Vampire: The Masquerade V20, the 20th Anniversary Edition of White Wolf's Vampire: The Masquerade roleplaying game
VIC-20, a home computer by Commodore International
LG V20, an Android smartphone manufactured by LG Electronics